Kovel Raion is a raion in Volyn Oblast in western Ukraine. Its administrative center is Kovel. Population: 

On 18 July 2020, as part of the administrative reform of Ukraine, the number of raions of Volyn Oblast was reduced to four, and the area of Kovel Raion was significantly expanded.  The January 2020 estimate of the raion population was

Notable people
 

Dmitry Abramovich (1873—1955), Soviet historian and writer

See also
 Administrative divisions of Volyn Oblast

References

External links
 koveladm.gov.ua 

Raions of Volyn Oblast
1939 establishments in Ukraine